Lemyra bornemontana is a moth of the family Erebidae. It was described by Jeremy Daniel Holloway in 1988. It is found on Borneo. The habitat consists of upper montane forests.

References

 

bornemontana
Moths described in 1988